Dawath is a village and corresponding community development block in Rohtas district of Bihar state, India. The nearest city is the nagar panchayat town of Koath, which is administered as part of Dawath block.

As of 2011, the population of Dawath was 5,372, in 828 households. The entire block had a population of 108,455.

Geography 
The entirety of Dawath block lies on the Sasaram Plain.

Demographics 

In 2011, the sex ratio of Dawath block was 944, above the district average of 921. The sex ratio was higher in the 0-6 age group at 958, which was the highest in Rohtas. Scheduled castes made up 16.41% of the block population and members of scheduled tribes made up 0.16%. The literacy rate of Dawath block was 71.13%, slightly below the Rohtas district rate of 73.37$%. There was a 22.93% gap in literacy between men and women, with 82.22% of men but only 59.29% of women able to read and write.

Amenities 
As of 2011, Dawath village did not have tap water; drinking water was instead provided by well and hand pump. It had permanent pucca roads connected to both national and state highways. There was a community centre, a public library, and sports fields. The town had access to electrical power.

Villages 
There are 66 villages in Dawath block, including Dawath itself. Of these, 60 are inhabited and 6 are uninhabited.

References 

Villages in Rohtas district